Cable lacing is a method for tying wiring harnesses and cable looms, traditionally used in telecommunication, naval, and aerospace applications.  This old cable management technique, taught to generations of lineworkers, is still used in some modern applications since it does not create obstructions along the length of the cable, avoiding the handling problems of cables groomed by plastic or hook-and-loop cable ties.

Cable lacing uses a thin cord, which is traditionally made of waxed linen, to bind together a group of cables using a series of running lockstitches.  Flat lacing tapes made of modern materials such as nylon, polyester, Teflon, fiberglass, and Nomex are also available with a variety of coatings to improve knot holding.

Styles
The lacing begins and ends with a whipping or other knot to secure the free ends.  Wraps are spaced relative to the overall harness diameter to maintain the wiring in a tight, neat bundle, and the ends are then neatly trimmed.  In addition to continuous or running lacing, there are a variety of lacing patterns used in different circumstances.  In some cases stand-alone knots called spot ties are also used.  For lashing large cables and cable bundles to support structures in telecommunications applications, there are two named cable lacing styles: the "Chicago stitch" and "Kansas City stitch".

Some organizations have in-house standards to which cable lacing must conform, for example NASA specifies its cable lacing techniques in chapter 9 of NASA-STD-8739.4.

Examples

Notes and references

External links 

 NASA Technical Standard NASA-STD-8739.4 on Crimping, Interconnecting Cables, Harnesses, and Wiring
 
 Online excerpt from Electronic Installation Practices Manual (1951), "Chapter 9, Cabling"
 Online excerpt from Workmanship and Design Practices for Electronic Equipment (1962)
 Cable lacing tutorial using modern lacing tape
 History, tools, and techniques
 FAA Advisory Circular 43.13-1B paragraph 11-158

Signal cables
Aerospace engineering
Ropework